Tomáš Huk (born 22 December 1994) is a Slovak professional footballer who plays as a centre-back for Ekstraklasa club Piast Gliwice.

Club career

MFK Košice
He made his debut for Košice under future national team coach Ján Kozák, on 3 November 2012, in a 0–0 away Corgoň Liga draw against AS Trenčín, coming on as a 52nd minute replacement for Peter Šinglár.

DAC Dunajská Streda
On 6 February 2016, he signed three-and-half year contract with DAC Dunajská Streda.

International career
Huk was first called up to the senior national team for two unofficial friendly fixtures held in Abu Dhabi, UAE, in January 2017, against Uganda and Sweden, by his former coach from MFK Košice - Ján Kozák, who coached him in 2012. He capped his debut against Uganda, being fielded since the 70th minute, when he substituted Martin Bukata. Slovakia went on to lose the game 1–3. Huk also played the full length of a 0–6 loss to Sweden.

References

External links
MFK Košice profile

1994 births
Living people
Sportspeople from Košice
Slovak footballers
Slovak expatriate footballers
Slovakia youth international footballers
Slovakia under-21 international footballers
Slovakia international footballers
Association football defenders
FC VSS Košice players
FC DAC 1904 Dunajská Streda players
Piast Gliwice players
Slovak Super Liga players
Ekstraklasa players
Expatriate footballers in Poland
Slovak expatriate sportspeople in Poland